War of the Century: When Hitler Fought Stalin, is a BBC documentary film series that examines Adolf Hitler's invasion of the Soviet Union in 1941 and the no-holds-barred war on both sides.  It not only examines the war but also the terror inside the Soviet Union at the time due to the paranoia of Joseph Stalin—the revenge atrocities, the Great Purge of army officers, the near-lunatic orders, and the paranoia of being upstaged by others, especially Marshal Zhukov.  The historical adviser is Ian Kershaw.

Media information

DVD release
The film was released on Region 2 DVD by BBC Video as part of the BBC World War II DVD Collection.

Companion book

References

External links 
 

1999 British television series debuts
1999 British television series endings
1990s British documentary television series
1990s British television miniseries
Documentary television series about World War II
BBC History of World War II
English-language television shows